Olivier Mitterrand (born 1943) is a French business executive and the CEO of Les Nouveaux Constructeurs. He is the nephew of former French President François Mitterrand and the brother of the Minister of Culture, Frédéric Mitterrand.

Biography
He is a graduate of the École Polytechnique and Harvard Business School. In 1969, he worked for Générale de Location, and for Compagnie de La Hénin in 1971. In 1972, he founded Les Nouveaux Constructeurs, a real-estate company.

In April 2010, he became Officer of the Légion d'honneur.

References

1943 births
Living people
École Polytechnique alumni
French chief executives
Officiers of the Légion d'honneur
Harvard Business School alumni